Lene Grawford Nystrøm (born 2 October 1973) is a Norwegian musician and singer-songwriter who is the female lead vocalist of the Danish-Norwegian Eurodance group Aqua.

Life and career

1973–1994: Early life 
Nystrøm was born in Tønsberg, Norway. When she was a teenager, she became interested in performing. She began modeling and also worked as a bartender. From 1990 to 1993, she appeared on the Norwegian game show Casino which aired on TVNorge.

1994–2001: Aqua and Aquarium 

In 1994, Nystrøm was working as a singer on the Norwegian cruise ship MS Peter Wessel and was spotted by musician René Dif. He recruited her as lead singer for the music group Joyspeed, later renamed Aqua. The group consisted of vocalists Nystrøm, Dif along with Søren Rasted and Claus Norreen. In 2001, the band split up.

2002–2006: Solo career and Play With Me 
After the breakup of Aqua, Nystrøm continued as a soloist. In 2003, she released her first album Play with Me. It marked a change in her musical style, from the bubblegum sound of Aqua to a more R&B-influenced style. It reached number 30 on Denmark's Hitlisten chart and 74 on Norway's VG-lista chart. The album single "Virgin Superstar" was given some radio airplay, but did not chart and was not released. Her debut single "It's Your Duty" was released on 8 September. It peaked at number 3 on Denmark's Hitlisten chart and number 9 on Norway's VG-lista chart.

In 2004, she released the second single "Pretty Young Thing", a cover of Stella Soleil, which did not chart. She released a third and fourth single as limited vinyl promos of a cover version of "Here We Go", which was originally performed by Moonbaby, and "Scream" to DJs and radio stations. The song "We Wanna Party", which Nystrøm recorded and co-wrote with Xenomania, appeared on Girls Aloud's 2008 album Out of Control. Nystrøm and Xenomania co-wrote two more Girls Aloud songs, the tracks "No Good Advice" and "You Freak Me Out", which appeared on the Girls Aloud debut album Sound of the Underground. "No Good Advice" became a breakout hit for the group. In 2005, Nystrøm provided guest vocals on the LazyB single "I Love N.Y." and as part of charity project Giv Til Asien on the single Hvor små vi er, which peaked at number 1 at Danish single charts.

2007 – present: Aqua reunion 
On 26 October 2007, Nystrøm reunited with the other members of Aqua, and solicited opportunities for a single summer concert tour. After fielding offers by record companies in Denmark, Canada, United States, and United Kingdom, they settled with an eight concert tour in Denmark as part of the 2008 Grøn Koncert festival. After the big success of the summer concert, Nystrøm continued with work with Aqua and released a new track, "Back to the 80's", on 25 May 2009. They released their greatest hits album on 15 June, which featured the track, along with sixteen remastered tracks and three other new songs, "My Mamma Said", "Spin Me a Christmas" and "Live Fast, Die Young". From May to August, they toured Scandinavia and performed at several gigs in Germany, the UK, and France.

The greatest hits CD was released in North America and many European countries on 22 September, and in the UK on 29 September. In 2009, Nystrøm had a major role in the 2009 film Deliver Us from Evil under Danish director Ole Bornedal. On 14 March 2011, Aqua released the single "How R U Doin?". They released the album Megalomania, on 3 October. She is one of the judges for Voice – Danmarks største stemme (Denmark's version of The Voice) which aired from November 2011 to February 2012 and also a judge in The Voice of Norway. Nystrøm acted in the movie Varg Veum – Cold Hearts (2012 film) as Varg Veum's girlfriend, whose profession was that of a social worker.

Personal life 
Nystrøm was in a relationship with fellow Aqua band member René Dif, who invited her to join the band in 1994. They were in a relationship for three years, before they broke up.

On 25 August 2001, Nystrøm married fellow Aqua band member Søren Rasted, with the ceremony being held in Las Vegas. In 2004 the couple moved to Denmark from London. Together, they have a daughter, India, and a son Billy. The couple divorced on 27 April 2017 after fifteen years of marriage.

Discography

Studio albums

Singles

As lead artist

As featured artist

Promotional singles

Other appearances

Filmography

Films

Series

Music videos

Commercials

TV appearances 
 2000: "Danish Grammy Awards 2000"
 2000: "Harald Schmidt Show" – "Show No. 791 – Harald Und Die Windsors"
 2003: "Boogie Århus Lisen" – 13 September 2003
 2003: "Stjerne for en aften – Vinderen" – Episode 1.2
 2003: "Først & sist med Fredrik Skavland" – Episode 10.2
 2003: "Senkveld med Thomas og Harald" – 3 October 2003
 2003: "Junior Eurovision Song Contest 2003"
 2003: "God kveld Norge" – 27 September 2003
 2003: "God kveld Norge" – 22 November 2003
 2005: "Hele Historien"
 2005: "Nordic Music Awards 2005 – Countdown" – (Host)
 2006: "Go' aften Danmark" – 10 December 2006
 2007: "Miss Africa Danmark 2007" – (Opening Speech)
 2007: "DR1's Grand Danois Awards 2007"
 2008: "Reimers" – Episode 1.3 – 10 October 2008
 2008: "21st European Film Awards 2008"
 2009: "Bornedal og det onde – bag kameraet"
 2010: "Det nye talkshow" – 12 November 2010
 2010: "Litt av et liv" – 17 November 2010
 2011: "Skavlan" – 28 January 2011
 2011: "Familien fra Bryggen" – Episode 1.1
 2012: "Voice – Danmarks største stemme" – 8 Episodes

References

External links 

1973 births
Aqua (band) members
English-language singers from Norway
Living people
Musicians from Tønsberg
Norwegian dance musicians
Norwegian expatriates in Denmark
Norwegian expatriates in the United Kingdom
Norwegian women singers
Norwegian film actresses
Norwegian pop singers
People from Re, Norway